Danielle Nicole Taylor (born October 25, 1989) is an American mixed martial artist. She was the  Strawweight  King of the Cage (KOTC) champion (2 times), competed in the Ultimate Fighting Championship (UFC) women's strawweight division and is currently competing for Invicta FC.

Background

Personal background 
Taylor was born in Lancaster, California, United States on October 25, 1989, and she is a full-time Deputy Sheriff for the Los Angeles County Sheriff's Department at the North County Correctional Facility in Castaic, California.

MMA background 
Taylor started training  in boxing, when she first got on with the Sheriff's Department in 2010, as she believed she needed to know some self-defense for her job. After struggling to find boxing matches to compete, she moved her focus to MMA, and she began to add wrestling and jiu-jitsu into her training. She was encouraged by her coach to try on  MMA competitions and fell in love with the sport, where she fought  a total of 5 amateur fights with record of 4 wins and 1 loss, paving the path to her MMA career 

She joined King of the Cage (KOTC) promotion for 2 years, from March 2014 to March 2016. She picked up all first five bouts and captured women's strawweight division championship from Glena Avila. However, she did not manage to defend her title against Jamie Colleen, but was able to reclaim the title by TKO from Colleen in the rematch in KOTC: Night of the Champion in 5 March 2016, and soon later she joined Ultimate Fighting Championship (UFC) in 2016.

Despite her small stature, 5 feet 0 inches, she has above average power for the strawweight division. She has the ability to power in with a right hand knockout punch, where she would face fighters who have reach and height over her that can control her from outside and on the clinch.

She does conditioning at Chain Fitness and trains striking at Saekson Muay Thai under Julio Trana.

Mixed martial arts career

Early career

2013–2014 

She had five amateur fights in both strawweight and flyweight divisions, from May 2013 to January 2014, under KOTC and Tuff-Nuff promotions, with four wins against Lena Hellqvist, Chelsea Lewis, Rachael Smith and Samantha Hester, and one loss to Wendy Julian.

King of the Cage

2014 

Danielle made her professional career debut in the Flyweight division (125 lb) of KOTC, facing  Maia Kahaunaele-Stevenson at KOTC: Beaten Path main card, in California, securing a unanimous decision win in 3 round bout.

She was up against Jillian Lybarger on March 26, 2014 on her second fight in Arizona at KOtC: Alliance. The bout was refereed by Mike Beltran. She won by TKO (punches).

Danielle submitted Nikki Lowe with an armbar on round 1 on August 7, 2014, on KOTC: Point of Impact in California.

On her 4th professional fight, she secured a unanimous win decision  over Maria Andaverde at KOTC: Battle For The Belt in California.

2015 

On 12 February 2015, Taylor was granted a Strawweight Championship fight facing Glena Avila, and stole a split decision win with Herb Dean as the referee on KOTC: Short Fuse and crowned the- KOTC Strawweight champion.

Danielle lost her first title defense five months later to Jamie Colleen, where she was knocked out on August 29, 2017, at KOTC Bitter Rivals in California on round 4.

After her last loss, Taylor made a comeback with a TKO win against Calie Cutler in Las Vegas on KOTC: Sinister Intention event on October 17, 2015, with the record of 6–1–0 in 2016.

2016 

Danielle started her 2016 fight on March 5 on  KOTC: Night of Champions in California and managed to reclaimed the 15 Ib strawweight title from Jamie Colleen  at 5th round  with TKO punches.

Ultimate Fighting Championship

2016 
Taylor signed with Ultimate Fighting Championship in 2016 with a 7–1 record.

Taylor made her promotional UFC debut in on  August 6, 2016, with 9 days notice at Salt Lake City, US, on UFC Fight Night: Rodríguez vs. Caceres  She stepped in for the injured Justine Kish, facing 8th-ranked Maryna Moroz.  She  suffered a split-decision loss.

In her second bout with UFC she gained a  win over South Korea fighter Seo Hee Ham (16-8MMA, 1-3 UFC), at UFC Fight Night: Whittaker vs. Brunson on 26 November 2016 at Melbourne, Australia, with a split-decision (28-29, 30-27, 30-27).

2017 
On UFC Fight Night: Swanson vs. Lobov at Nashville, United States Dannielle faced Jessica Penne ( 12-5 MMA, 1-3 UFC) on the preliminary card on 22 April 2017. She secured a win with unanimous decision, outpointing with scores of 29-28 across the board from the judges, where John McCarthy was the referee of the bout.

2018 
Taylor faced JJ Aldrich on January 14, 2018 at UFC Fight Night: Stephens vs. Choi. She lost the fight via unanimous decision.

Taylor faced Zhang Weili on August 4, 2018 at UFC 227. She lost the fight by unanimous decision.

On August 30, Taylor was released from the UFC.

Post-UFC career
After the release from the UFC, Taylor signed with Invicta FC. She made her promotional debut against Montserrat Ruiz at Invicta FC 33 on December 15, 2018. She won the fight via unanimous decision.

She then entered the Invicta Phoenix Series 1 Strawweight tournament, facing Juliana Lima in the quarterfinals. She lost the bout via split decision and was eliminated from the tournament.

In late 2020, Taylor signed with Xtreme Fighting Championships and made her promotional debut against Jessica Aguilar at XFC 43 on November 11, 2020, winning by split decision.

Taylor faced Emily Ducote for the vacant Invicta FC Strawweight Championship at Invicta FC 44: A New Era on August 27, 2021. Her bout with Ducote headlined the first pay-per-view in Invicta FC history. Taylor lost the fight by a first-round knockout. She was first stopped in her tracks with a right straight, before being floored with a head kick.

Taylor faced Liz Tracy at Invicta FC 46 on March 9, 2022. At the weigh-ins, Liz Tracy missed weight for her bout, weighing in at 117.8 pounds, 1.8 pounds over the strawweight non-title fight limit. The bout proceeded at catchweight and Tracy were fined 25 percent of their purses, which went to Taylor. She lost the bout via unanimous decision.

Taylor is scheduled face Jéssica Delboni on May 3, 2023, at Invicta FC 53: DeCoursey vs. Dos Santos.

Championships and accomplishments

Mixed martial arts

King of the Cage (KOTC)
KOTC Strawweight Champion (2 times)

Mixed martial arts record 

|-
| Loss
| align=center| 11–6
| Liz Tracy
| Decision (unanimous)
| Invicta FC 46: Rodríguez vs. Torquato II
| 
| align=center| 3
| align=center|5:00
| Kansas City, Kansas, United States
| 
|-
|Loss
|align=center|11–5
|Emily Ducote 
|KO (punch & head kick)
|Invicta FC 44: A New Era
|
|align=center|1
|align=center|2:51
|Kansas City, Kansas, United States
|
|-
|Win
|align=center|11–4
|Jessica Aguilar
|Decision (split)
|XFC 43
|
|align=center|3
|align=center|5:00
|Atlanta, Georgia, United States
|
|-
|Win
|align=center| 10–4
|Montserrat Ruiz
|Decision (unanimous)
|Invicta FC 33: Frey vs. Grusander II
|
|align=center|3
|align=center|5:00
|Kansas City, Missouri, United States
|
|-
|Loss
|align=center| 9–4
|Zhang Weili
|Decision (unanimous)
|UFC 227 
|
|align=center|3
|align=center|5:00
|Los Angeles, California, United States
|
|-
|Loss
|align=center| 9–3
|JJ Aldrich
|Decision (unanimous)
|UFC Fight Night: Stephens vs. Choi
|
|align=center|3
|align=center|5:00
|St. Louis, Missouri, United States
|
|-
| Win
| align=center| 9–2
| Jessica Penne
| Decision (unanimous)
| UFC Fight Night: Swanson vs. Lobov
| 
| align=center| 3
| align=center| 5:00
| Nashville, Tennessee, United States
| 
|-
| Win
| align=center| 8–2
| Seo Hee Ham
| Decision (split)
| UFC Fight Night: Whittaker vs. Brunson
| 
| align=center| 3
| align=center| 5:00
| Melbourne, Australia
| 
|-
| Loss
| align=center| 7–2
| Maryna Moroz
| Decision (split)
| UFC Fight Night: Rodríguez vs. Caceres
| 
| align=center| 3
| align=center| 5:00
| Salt Lake City, Utah, United States
|
|-
| Win
| align=center| 7–1
| Jamie Colleen
| TKO (punches)
| KOTC: Night of Champions
| 
| align=center| 5
| align=center| 2:15
| Ontario, California, United States
|
|-
| Win
| align=center| 6–1
| Calie Cutler
| TKO (punches)
| KOTC: Sinister Intentions
| 
| align=center| 1
| align=center| 1:58
| Las Vegas, Nevada, United States
| 
|-
| Loss
| align=center| 5–1
| Jamie Colleen
| KO (punch)
| KOTC: Bitter Rivals
| 
| align=center| 4
| align=center| 1:47
| Ontario, California, United States
|
|-
| Win
| align=center| 5–0
| Glena Avila
| Decision (split)
| KOTC: Short Fuse
| 
| align=center| 5
| align=center| 5:00
| Worley, Idaho, United States
|
|-
| Win
| align=center| 4–0
| Maria Andaverde
| Decision (unanimous)
| KOTC: Battle For The Belt
| 
| align=center| 3
| align=center| 5:00
| Highland, California, United States
| 
|-
| Win
| align=center| 3–0
| Nikki Lowe
| Submission (armbar)
| KOTC: Point of Impact
| 
| align=center| 1
| align=center| 4:22
| Highland, California, United States
| 
|-
| Win
| align=center| 2–0
| Jillian Lybarger
| TKO (punches)
| KOTC: Alliance
| 
| align=center| 3
| align=center| 1:26
| Scottsdale, Arizona, United States
| 
|-
| Win
| align=center| 1–0
| Maia Kahaunaele-Stevenson
| Decision (unanimous)
| KOTC: Beaten Path
| 
| align=center| 3
| align=center| 5:00
| Highland, California, United States
|

Mixed martial arts exhibition record 

|-
|Loss
|align=center| 10–4
|Juliana Lima
|Decision (split)
|Invicta Phoenix Series 1
|
|align=center|1
|align=center|5:00
|Kansas City, Kansas, United States
|Invicta FC Strawweight Tournament Quarterfinal
|-

See also
 List of female mixed martial artists
 List of King of the Cage champions

References

External links
 
 
 Danielle Taylor at Invicta FC
 
 

Living people
1989 births
People from Lancaster, California
American female mixed martial artists
Strawweight mixed martial artists
Mixed martial artists from California
Flyweight mixed martial artists
Mixed martial artists utilizing boxing
Mixed martial artists utilizing wrestling
Mixed martial artists utilizing Brazilian jiu-jitsu
American practitioners of Brazilian jiu-jitsu
Female Brazilian jiu-jitsu practitioners
21st-century American women
Ultimate Fighting Championship female fighters